Evan Shelby Connell Jr. (August 17, 1924 – January 10, 2013) was a U.S. novelist, short-story writer, essayist and author of epic historical works. He also published under the name Evan S. Connell Jr. 

In 2009, Connell was nominated for the Man Booker International Prize, for lifetime achievement. On April 23, 2010, he was awarded a Los Angeles Times Book Prize: the Robert Kirsch Award, for "a living author with a substantial connection to the American West, whose contribution to American letters deserves special recognition."

Background
Connell was born in Kansas City, Missouri, the only son of Evan S. Connell, Sr. (1890–1974), a physician, and Ruth Elton Connell. He had a sister, Barbara (Mrs. Matthew Zimmermann), to whom he dedicated his novel Mrs. Bridge (1959). He graduated from Southwest High School in Kansas City in 1941.  He started undergraduate work at Dartmouth College but joined the Navy in 1943 and became a pilot. After the end of World War II, he graduated from the University of Kansas in 1947, with a B.A. in English. He studied creative writing at Columbia University in New York and Stanford University in California. He never married, and lived and worked in San Francisco and Sausalito, California from 1954 to 1989, when he moved to Santa Fe, N.M.

Connell was found dead on January 10, 2013, at an assisted-living facility in Santa Fe, New Mexico.

Career
Connell's novels Mrs. Bridge (1959) and Mr. Bridge (1969) are bittersweet, gently satirical portraits of a conventional, unimaginative upper middle-class couple living in Kansas City from the 1920s to the 1940s. The couple tries to live up to societal expectations and to be good parents, but they are sadly incapable of bridging the emotional distance between themselves and their children, and between each other.

The pair of novels was adapted as a 1990 Merchant-Ivory motion picture, Mr. and Mrs. Bridge, starring Paul Newman and Joanne Woodward. Critics gave the film mostly positive reviews.

Connell's 1960 novel, The Patriot, is the story of Melvin Isaacs, aged 17, and his experiences in naval aviation school during the Second World War. Melvin faces the terrifying reality of training and the likelihood of his "washing out" (failing).  Melvin's attempts to communicate the realities of his experience to his father are rebuffed.  The characters of Melvin and his father Jacob are similar in many respects to those of Douglas and Mr. Bridge. Though not well reviewed, The Patriot contains some rewarding social satire and impressive scenes of aviation.

Connell's 1984 sweeping account of George Armstrong Custer and the Battle of the Little Bighorn, Son of the Morning Star, earned critical acclaim, was a bestseller, and was adapted as a television film/miniseries in 1991. The film won four Emmy Awards.

Dorothy Parker described Connell as "a writer of fine style and amazing variety".

Legacy and honors
 1959, Mrs. Bridge was a finalist for the National Book Award in fiction.
 1974, Points for a Compass Rose was a finalist for the National Book Award in poetry.
 2009, he was nominated for the third Man Booker International Prize, for lifetime achievement.
 2010, he received the Los Angeles Times Book Prize: the Robert Kirsch Award.

Bibliography
"I'll Take You To Tennessee," in Stanford Short Stories Nineteen Forty-Nine. Edited by Wallace Stegner. (1949)
The Anatomy Lesson (1957) (short stories)
Mrs. Bridge (1959)
The Patriot (1960)
Notes From A Bottle Found on the Beach at Carmel (1962) (poetry)
At The Crossroads (1965) (short stories)
The Diary of a Rapist (1966)
 "Here it is", in Why Work Series, editor Gordon Lish (1966)
Mr. Bridge (1969)
Points for A Compass Rose (1973) (poetry)
The Connoisseur (1974)
Double Honeymoon (1976)
A Long Desire (1979) (essays)
White Lantern (1981) (essays)
"Saint Augustine's Pigeon: The Selected Stories of Evan S. Connell" (1982)
Son of the Morning Star: Custer and the Little Bighorn (1985) (non-fiction)
The Alchymist's Journal (1991, republished in 2006 as Alchymic Journals)
The Collected Stories of Evan S. Connell (1995)
Deus Lo Volt (2000)
The Aztec Treasure House: New and Selected Essays (2001)(non-fiction)
Francisco Goya: A Life (2004)
Lost in Uttar Pradesh (2008)

References

Literary Alchemist: The Writing Life of Evan S. Connell, by Steve Paul (2021) (biography)

External links
Mark Oppenheimer, "An Era of Awkward Oppression: Evan Connell's Wasps, Spent and Repressed, Offer the Truest View of American Alienation", Believer, February 2005
Salon.com piece on Connell
Special issue on Connell: Three articles about him, Open Letters Monthly: an Arts and Literature Review, August 2008: Sam Sacks, "Familiar Wishes"; Steve Donoghue, "Gathering Driftwood"; and John Cotter, "Backyard Arcana"
 Washington Post obituary
SPRING2014 the Paris Review,  "A Visit with Evan Connell" p. 248-265, Gemma Sief.
I Am a Lover

1924 births
2013 deaths
Writers from Kansas City, Missouri
20th-century American novelists
Members of the American Academy of Arts and Letters
University of Kansas alumni
Dartmouth College alumni
Columbia University School of the Arts alumni
Stanford University alumni
American male biographers
20th-century American poets
20th-century American biographers
American male novelists
American male essayists
American male poets
American male short story writers
20th-century American short story writers
20th-century American essayists
20th-century American male writers
United States Navy pilots of World War II